La Pintana is a commune of Chile located in Santiago Province, Santiago Metropolitan Region. La Pintana is home to Antumapu, the agricultural and veterinary sciences campus of University of Chile, Chile's oldest university.

Demographics
The population grew by 12.1% (20,445 persons) between the 1990 and 1999 censuses. The 2006 projected population was 201,183.

Stats
Average annual household income: US$23,576 (PPP, 2006)
Population below poverty line: 17.2% (2006)
Regional quality of life index: 73.29, medium, 30 out of 52 (2005)
Human Development Index: 0.679, 171 out of 341 (2003)

Administration
As a commune, La Pintana is a third-level administrative division of Chile administered by a municipal council, headed by an alcalde who is directly elected every four years. The 2012-2016 alcalde is Jaime Pavez Moreno (PPD). The communal council has the following members:
 Patricia Pavez Moreno (PPD)
 Claudia Pizarro Peña (DC)
 Marcelo Sandoval Tillería (PPD)
 Wilson Navarrete Rubio (PPD)
 Luis Huneeus Madge (RN)
 Luis Ayala Pastén (PC)
 Abigail Acosta Soto (UDI)
 Manuel Pavez Rubio (PS)

Within the electoral divisions of Chile, La Pintana is represented in the Chamber of Deputies by Osvaldo Andrade (PS) and Leopoldo Pérez (RN) as part of the 29th electoral district, (together with Puente Alto, Pirque and San José de Maipo). The commune is represented in the Senate by Soledad Alvear (PDC) and Pablo Longueira (UDI) as part of the 8th senatorial constituency (Santiago-East).

See also 
 Bajos de Mena

References

External links
  Municipality of La Pintana

Populated places in Santiago Province, Chile
Communes of Chile
Geography of Santiago, Chile